70,000 (seventy thousand) is the natural number that comes after 69,999 and before 70,001. It is a round number.

Selected numbers in the range 70001–79999

70001 to 70999

71000 to 71999
 71656 = pentagonal pyramidal number

72000 to 72999

73000 to 73999
 73296 = is the smallest number n, for which n−3, n−2, n−1, n+1, n+2, n+3 are all Sphenic number.
 73440 = 15 × 16 × 17 × 18
 73712 = number of n-Queens Problem solutions for n = 13
 73728 = 3-smooth number

74000 to 74999
 74088 = 423
 74205 = registry number of the USS Defiant on Star Trek: Deep Space Nine
 74353 = Friedman prime
 74656 = registry number of the USS Voyager on Star Trek: Voyager
 74897 = Friedman prime

75000 to 75999
 75025 = Fibonacci number, Markov number
 75361 = Carmichael number

76000 to 76999
 76084 = amicable number with 63020
 76424 = tetranacci number

77000 to 77999
 77777 = repdigit
 77778 = Kaprekar number

78000 to 78999
 78125 = 57
 78163 = Friedman prime
 78498 = the number of primes under 1,000,000
 78557 = conjectured to be the smallest Sierpiński number
 78732 = 3-smooth number

79000 to 79999
 79507 = 433

References

70000